Udbodhan is the only Bengali publication of the Ramakrishna Math and Ramakrishna Mission, started by Vivekananda in January 1899, with Trigunatitananda as its founding editor  Over the years, it also grew into a publishing house, and remained one of the leading publishers of literature of Ramakrishna and Vivekananda.

Library facilities,  reading and lending books are available at Udbodhan office. The collection varies from history, culture, the Vedas, the Upanishads to adventures.

History

Before the publication of Udbodhan, the Brahmavadin and Prabuddha Bharata were being published from Madras under Vivekananda's inspiration, but these were not the official journals of the Ramakrishna Order. It was only later that the Prabuddha Bharata was taken over by Ramakrishna Mission and published first from Almora, then from Mayavati, and now from Kolkata.

The construction of the present building was started by Saradananda, the then editor, in 1907, subsequently, the magazine shifted to the ground floor of the building while Sarada Devi, wife of Ramakrishna lived on upper floor

Editors
 Trigunatitananda, founding editor 
 Saradananda
 Ritananda 
 Swami krishnanathananda- Present editor

Publications 

 Karma Yoga
 Jnana Yoga
 Mukti Ebang Tahar Sadhan

See more

References

External links
 Official website
Udbodhan, Online Issues
Official Website of the Belur Math

Ramakrishna Mission
Hindu magazines
Bengali-language magazines
Magazines established in 1899
Mass media in Kolkata
Hindu newspapers
1899 establishments in India
Magazines about spirituality